Ink Complete is progressive instrumental band Spastic Ink's debut album, released in 1997 via Germany's Dream Circle label and re-issued in 2000 on EclecticElectric, with 25 minutes of 'work tapes' added as bonus tracks.

Track listing
 "The Mad Data Race" – 5:15
 "A Morning with Squeakie" – 3:24
 "Just a Little Dirty" – 1:43
 "See, and It's Sharp!" – 4:31
 "Suspended on All Fours" – 2:04
 "A Wild Hare" – 8:15
 "Harm and Half-Time Baking Shuffle" – 2:46
 "To Counter and Groove in E Minor" – 4:05
 "That 178 Thing" – 4:27
 "Eighths Is Enough" – 4:00
 "Mosquito Brain Surgery" – 8:11
 (Hidden track) – 24:48

Personnel
 Ron Jarzombek – guitar
 Bobby Jarzombek – drums
 Pete Perez – bass

References

1997 debut albums
Spastic Ink albums